Countess of Essex may refer to:

1st creation
Rohese de Vere, Countess of Essex, 12th century (wife of the 1st Earl)
Hawise, Countess of Aumale (died 1214) (wife of the 3rd Earl)
2nd creation
Aveline de Clare, Countess of Essex (1178-1225) (wife of 1st Earl)
3rd creation
Elizabeth of Rhuddlan (1282–1316) (wife of the 3rd Earl)
Joan Fitzalan, Countess of Hereford (1347–1419) (wife of the 6th Earl)
4th creation
Eleanor de Bohun (c. 1366–1399) (wife of the 1st Earl)
5th creation
Isabel of Cambridge, Countess of Essex (1409–1484) (wife of the 1st Earl)
7th creation
Elisabeth Parr, Marchioness of Northampton (née Brooke ; 1526–1565) (wife of the 1st Earl)
8th creation
Lettice Knollys (1543–1634) (wife of the 1st Earl)
Frances Walsingham (1567–1631) (wife of the 2nd Earl)
Frances Carr, Countess of Somerset (née Howard ; 1590–1632) (wife of the 3rd Earl)
9th creation
Elizabeth Capell, Countess of Essex (née Percy ; 1636–1718) (wife of the 1st Earl)
Mary Capel, Countess of Essex (née Bentinck ; 1679–1726) (wife of the 2nd Earl)
Jane Capell, Countess of Essex (née Hyde; 1694–1724) (1st wife of the 3rd Earl)
Elizabeth Capell, Countess of Essex (1704–1784) (née Russell) (2nd wife of the 3rd Earl)
Sarah, Countess of Essex (née Bazett ; 1759–1838) (1st wife of the 5th Earl)
Catherine Stephens, Countess of Essex (1794–1882), English vocalist and actress (2nd wife of the 5th Earl)
Adele Capell, Countess of Essex (d. 28 July 1922), US-born beauty and socialite. (wife of George Devereux de Vere Capell, 7th Earl of Essex)